Laurie E. Gaspar is a professor emerita in the department of radiation oncology at the University of Colorado. She specializes in lung cancer and brain tumors. She is currently the treasurer for the American Society for Clinical Oncology.

Education 
In 1982, Gaspar received her MD from the University of Western Ontario. She graduated a few months later than her class as a result of taking maternity leave. To fill the gap between receiving her degree and the next cycle of internships, she began doing research on cancer. She then completed a residency in radiation oncology at the University of Western Ontario.

In 2004, she completed an MBA from the University of Michigan.

Career 
Gaspar is a professor emerita in the department of radiation oncology at the University of Colorado. She was formerly the chair of the department.

Gaspar is the 2019-2020 treasurer for the American Society for Clinical Oncology. She is a board member for the International Society for the Study of Lung Cancer.

References 

University of Colorado faculty
American physicians
University of Western Ontario alumni
Year of birth missing (living people)
Living people